Aralia elata, the Japanese angelica tree, Chinese angelica-tree, or Korean angelica-tree, is a woody plant belonging to the family Araliaceae. It is known as tara-no-ki in Japanese, and dureup-namu in Korean.

Description

The bark is rough and gray with prickles. The leaves are alternate, large, 60–120 cm long, and double pinnate. The flowers are produced in large umbels in late summer, each flower small and white. The fruit is a small black drupe.

Aralia elata is closely related to the American species Aralia spinosa, with which it is easily confused.

Cultivation
Aralia elata is cultivated, often in a variegated form, for its exotic appearance. It prefers deep loamy soils in partial shade, but will grow in poorer soils and in full sun. The cultivars 'Variegata' and 'Aureovariegata' have gained the Royal Horticultural Society's Award of Garden Merit.

Gastronomy

Japan 

In Japan, the shoots are called tara-no-me and are eaten in the spring. They are picked from the end of the branches and are fried in a tempura batter.

Korea 

In Korean, the young shoot is called dureup, and the plant is called dureupnamu ("dureup tree"). Young shoots are harvested during a month, from early April to early May, when they are soft and fragrant. In Korean cuisine, the shoots are commonly eaten blanched as namul, pickled as jangajji, pan-fried as jeon, or deep-fried as bugak.

Invasive species
The tree was introduced into the United States in 1830. Birds like to eat the fruits, and are spreading its seeds, allowing the tree to expand its range as an invasive species in the Northeastern United States.

References

elata
Trees of Asia
Edible plants
Leaf vegetables
Aralia cordata
Korean vegetables